Jarosław Brawata (born 8 May 1956) is a Polish judoka. He competed in the men's half-middleweight event at the 1980 Summer Olympics.

References

1956 births
Living people
Polish male judoka
Olympic judoka of Poland
Judoka at the 1980 Summer Olympics
Sportspeople from Gdańsk